The Monaco Grand Prix is a Formula One motor racing event held annually on the Circuit de Monaco, in late May or early June. Run since 1929, it is widely considered to be one of the most important and prestigious automobile races in the world, and is one of the races—along with the Indianapolis 500 and the 24 Hours of Le Mans—that form the Triple Crown of Motorsport. The circuit has been called "an exceptional location of glamour and prestige". The Formula One event is usually held on the last weekend of May and is known as one of the largest weekends in auto racing, as the Formula One race occurs on the same Sunday as the Indianapolis 500 (IndyCar Series) and the Coca-Cola 600 (NASCAR Cup Series).

The race is held on a narrow course laid out in the streets of Monaco, with many elevation changes and tight corners as well as the tunnel, making it one of the most demanding tracks in Formula One. In spite of the relatively low average speeds, the Monaco circuit is a dangerous place to race due to how narrow the track is and the race often involves the intervention of a safety car. It is the only Grand Prix that does not adhere to the FIA's mandated  minimum race distance for F1 races.

The first Monaco Grand Prix took place on 14 April 1929, and the race eventually became part of the pre-Second World War European Championship and was included in the first World Championship of Drivers in 1950. It was twice designated the European Grand Prix, in 1955 and 1963, when this title was an honorary designation given each year to one Grand Prix race in Europe. Graham Hill was known as "Mr. Monaco" due to his five Monaco wins in the 1960s. Ayrton Senna won the race more times than any other driver, with six victories, winning five races consecutively between 1989 and 1993.

History

Origins

Like many European races, the Monaco Grand Prix predates the current World Championship. The principality's first Grand Prix was organised in 1929 by Antony Noghès, under the auspices of Prince Louis II, through the Automobile Club de Monaco (ACM), of which he was president. The ACM organised the Rallye Automobile Monte Carlo, and in 1928 applied to the Association Internationale des Automobiles Clubs Reconnus (AIACR), the international governing body of motorsport, to be upgraded from a regional French club to full national status. Their application was refused due to the lack of a major motorsport event held wholly within Monaco's boundaries. The rally could not be considered as it mostly used the roads of other European countries.

To attain full national status, Noghès proposed the creation of an automobile Grand Prix in the streets of Monte Carlo. He obtained the official sanction of Prince Louis II, and the support of Monégasque Grand Prix driver Louis Chiron. Chiron thought Monaco's topography well-suited to setting up a race track.

The first race, held on 14 April 1929, was won by William Grover-Williams (using the pseudonym "Williams"), driving a works Bugatti Type 35B. It was an invitation-only event, but not all of those invited decided to attend. The leading Maserati and Alfa Romeo drivers decided not to compete, but Bugatti was well represented. Mercedes sent their leading driver, Rudolf Caracciola. Starting fifteenth, Caracciola drove a fighting race, taking his SSK into the lead before wasting  minutes on refuelling and a tyre change to finish second. Another driver who competed using a pseudonym was "Georges Philippe", the Baron Philippe de Rothschild. Chiron was unable to compete, having a prior commitment to compete in the Indianapolis 500.

Caracciola's SSK was refused permission to race the following year, but Chiron did compete (in the works Bugatti Type 35C), when he was beaten by privateer René Dreyfus and his Bugatti Type 35B, and finished second. Chiron took victory in the 1931 race driving a Bugatti. , he remains the only native of Monaco to have won the event.

Pre-war
The race quickly grew in importance after its inception. Because of the high number of races which were being termed 'Grands Prix', the AIACR formally recognised the most important race of each of its affiliated national automobile clubs as International Grands Prix, or Grandes Épreuves, and in 1933 Monaco was ranked as such alongside the French, Belgian, Italian, and Spanish Grands Prix. That year's race was the first Grand Prix in which grid positions were decided, as they are now, by practice time rather than the established method of balloting. The race saw Achille Varzi and Tazio Nuvolari exchange the lead many times before the race being settled in Varzi's favour on the final lap when Nuvolari's car caught fire.

The race became a round of the new European Championship in 1936, when stormy weather and a broken oil line led to a series of crashes, eliminating the Mercedes-Benzes of Chiron, Fagioli, and von Brauchitsch, as well as Bernd Rosemeyer's Typ C for newcomer Auto Union; Rudolf Caracciola, proving the truth of his nickname, Regenmeister (Rainmaster), went on to win. In 1937, von Brauchitsch duelled Caracciola before coming out on top. It was the last prewar Grand Prix at Monaco, for in 1938, the lack of profits for organisers, and demand for nearly £500 (approximately £ adjusted to  inflation) in appearance money per top entrant led AIACR to cancel the event, while looming war overtook it in 1939, and the Second World War ended organised racing in Europe until 1945.

Post-war Grand Prix
Racing in Europe started again on 9 September 1945 at the Bois de Boulogne Park in the city of Paris, four months and one day after the end of the war in Europe. However, the Monaco Grand Prix was not run between 1945 and 1947 due to financial reasons. In 1946 a new premier racing category, Grand Prix, was defined by the Fédération Internationale de l'Automobile (FIA), the successor of the AIACR, based on the pre-war voiturette class. A Monaco Grand Prix was run to this formula in 1948, won by the future world champion Nino Farina in a Maserati 4CLT.

Formula One

Early championship days
The 1949 event was cancelled due to the death of Prince Louis II; it was included in the new Formula One World Drivers' Championship the following year. The race provided future five-time world champion Juan Manuel Fangio with his first win in a World Championship race, as well as third place for the 51-year-old Louis Chiron, his best result in the World Championship era. However, there was no race in 1951 due to budgetary concerns and a lack of regulations in the sport. 1952 was the first of the two years in which the World Drivers' Championship was run to less powerful Formula Two regulations. The race was run to sports car rules instead, and it did not form part of the World Championship.

No races were held in 1953 or 1954 due to the fact that the car regulations were not finalized.

The Monaco Grand Prix returned in 1955, again as part of the Formula One World Championship, and this would begin a streak of 64 consecutive years in which the race was held. In the 1955 race, Maurice Trintignant won in Monte Carlo for the first time and Chiron again scored points and at 56 became the oldest driver to compete in a Formula One Grand Prix. It was not until 1957, when Fangio won again, that the Grand Prix saw a double winner. Between 1954 and 1961 Fangio's former Mercedes colleague, Stirling Moss, went one better, as did Trintignant, who won the race again in 1958 driving a Cooper. The 1961 race saw Moss fend off three works Ferrari 156s in a year-old privateer Rob Walker Racing Team Lotus 18, to take his third Monaco victory.

Graham Hill's era

Britain's Graham Hill won the race five times in the 1960s and became known as "King of Monaco" and "Mr. Monaco". He first won in 1963, and then won the next two years. In the 1965 race he took pole position and led from the start, but went up an escape road on lap 25 to avoid hitting a slow backmarker. Re-joining in fifth place, Hill set several new lap records on the way to winning. The race was also notable for Jim Clark's absence (he was participating in the Indianapolis 500), and for Paul Hawkins's Lotus ending up in the harbour. Hill's teammate, Briton Jackie Stewart, won in 1966 and New Zealander Denny Hulme won in 1967, but Hill won the next two years, the 1969 event being his final Formula One championship victory, by which time he was a double Formula One world champion.

Track alterations, safety, and increasing business interests
By the start of the 1970s, efforts by Jackie Stewart saw several Formula One events cancelled because of safety concerns. For the 1969 event, Armco barriers were placed at specific points for the first time in the circuit's history. Before that, the circuit's conditions were (aside from the removal of people's production cars parked on the side of the road) virtually identical to everyday road use. If a driver went off, he had a chance to crash into whatever was next to the track (buildings, trees, lamp posts, glass windows, and even a train station), and in Alberto Ascari's and Paul Hawkins's cases, the harbour water, because the concrete road the course used had no Armco to protect the drivers from going off the track and into the Mediterranean. The circuit gained more Armco in specific points for the next two races, and by 1972, the circuit was almost completely Armco-lined. For the first time in its history, the Monaco circuit was altered in 1972 as the pits were moved next to the waterfront straight between the chicane and Tabac and the chicane was moved further forward right before Tabac becoming the junction point between the pits and the course. The course was changed again for the 1973 race. The Rainier III Nautical Stadium was constructed where the straight that went behind the pits was and the circuit introduced a double chicane that went around the new swimming pool (this chicane complex is known today as "Swimming Pool"). This created space for a whole new pit facility and in 1976 the course was altered yet again; the Sainte Devote corner was made slower and a chicane was placed right before the pit straight.

By the early 1970s, as Brabham team owner Bernie Ecclestone started to marshal the collective bargaining power of the Formula One Constructors Association (FOCA), Monaco was prestigious enough to become an early bone of contention. Historically the number of cars permitted in a race was decided by the race organiser, in this case the ACM, which had always set a low number of around 16. In 1972 Ecclestone started to negotiate deals which relied on FOCA guaranteeing at least 18 entrants for every race. A stand-off over this issue left the 1972 race in jeopardy until the ACM gave in and agreed that 26 cars could participate – the same number permitted at most other circuits. Two years later, in 1974, the ACM got the numbers back down to 18.

Because of its tight confines, slow average speeds and punishing nature, Monaco has often thrown up unexpected results. In the 1982 race René Arnoux led the first 15 laps, before retiring. Alain Prost then led until four laps from the end, when he spun off on the wet track, hit the barriers and lost a wheel, giving Riccardo Patrese the lead. Patrese himself spun with only a lap and a half to go, letting Didier Pironi through to the front, followed by Andrea de Cesaris. On the last lap, Pironi ran out of fuel in the tunnel, but De Cesaris also ran out of fuel before he could overtake. In the meantime, Patrese had bump-started his car and went through to score his first Grand Prix win.

In 1983 the ACM became entangled in the disagreements between Fédération Internationale du Sport Automobile (FISA) and FOCA. The ACM, with the agreement of Bernie Ecclestone, negotiated an individual television rights deal with ABC in the United States. This broke an agreement enforced by FISA for a single central negotiation of television rights. Jean-Marie Balestre, president of FISA, announced that the Monaco Grand Prix would not form part of the Formula One world championship in 1985. The ACM fought their case in the French courts. They won the case and the race was eventually reinstated.

Era of Prost/Senna dominance 
For the decade from 1984 to 1993 the race was won by only two drivers, arguably the two best drivers in Formula One at the time – Frenchman Alain Prost and Brazilian Ayrton Senna. Prost, already a winner of the support race for Formula Three cars in 1979, took his first Monaco win at the 1984 race. The race started 45 minutes late after heavy rain. Prost led briefly before Nigel Mansell overtook him on lap 11. Mansell crashed out five laps later, letting Prost back into the lead. On lap 27, Prost led from Ayrton Senna's Toleman and Stefan Bellof's Tyrrell. Senna was catching Prost and Bellof was catching both of them in the only naturally aspirated car in the race. However, on lap 31, the race was controversially stopped with conditions deemed to be undriveable. Later, FISA fined the clerk of the course, Jacky Ickx, $6,000 and suspended his licence for not consulting the stewards before stopping the race. The drivers received only half of the points that would usually be awarded, as the race had been stopped before two-thirds of the intended race distance had been completed.

Prost won 1985 after polesitter Senna retired with a blown Renault engine in his Lotus after over-revving it at the start, and Michele Alboreto in the Ferrari retook the lead twice, but he went off the track at Sainte-Devote, where Brazilian Nelson Piquet and Italian Riccardo Patrese had a huge accident only a few laps previously and oil and debris littered the track. Prost passed Alboreto, who retook the Frenchman, and then he punctured a tyre after running over bodywork debris from the Piquet/Patrese accident, which dropped him to 4th. He was able to pass his Roman countrymen Andrea De Cesaris and Elio de Angelis, but finished 2nd behind Prost. The French Prost dominated 1986 after starting from pole position, a race where the Nouvelle Chicane had been changed on the grounds of safety.

Senna holds the record for the most victories in Monaco, with six, including five consecutive wins between 1989 and 1993, as well as eight podium finishes in ten starts. His 1987 win was the first time a car with an active suspension had won a Grand Prix. He won this race after Briton Nigel Mansell in a Williams-Honda went out with a broken exhaust. His win was very popular with the people of Monaco, and when he was arrested on the Monday following the race, for riding a motorcycle without wearing a helmet, he was released by the officers after they realised who he was. Senna dominated 1988, and was able to get ahead of his teammate Prost while the Frenchman was held up for most of the race by Austrian Gerhard Berger in a Ferrari. By the time Prost got past Berger, he pushed as hard as he could and set a lap some 6 seconds faster than Senna's; Senna then set 2 fastest laps, and while pushing as hard as possible, he touched the barrier at the Portier corner and crashed into the Armco separating the road from the Mediterranean. Senna was so upset that he went back to his Monaco flat and was not heard from until the evening. Prost went on to win for the fourth time.

Senna dominated 1989 while Prost was stuck behind backmarker René Arnoux and others; the Brazilian also dominated 1990 and 1991. At the 1992 event Nigel Mansell, who had won all five races held to that point in the season, took pole and dominated the race in his Williams FW14B-Renault. However, with seven laps remaining, Mansell suffered a loose wheel nut and was forced into the pits, emerging behind Senna's McLaren-Honda, who was on worn tyres. Mansell, on fresh tyres, set a lap record almost two seconds quicker than Senna's and closed from 5.2 to 1.9 seconds in only two laps. The pair duelled around Monaco for the final four laps but Mansell could find no way past, finishing just two-tenths of a second behind the Brazilian. It was Senna's fifth win at Monaco, equalling Graham Hill's record. Senna had a poor start to the 1993 event, crashing in practice and qualifying 3rd behind pole-sitter Prost and the rising German star Michael Schumacher. Both of them beat Senna to the first corner, but Prost had to serve a time penalty for jumping the start and Schumacher retired after suspension problems, so Senna took his sixth win to break Graham Hill's record for most wins at the Monaco Grand Prix. Runner-up Damon Hill commented, "If my father was around now, he would be the first to congratulate Ayrton."

Modern times

The 1994 race was an emotional and tragic affair. It came two weeks after the race at Imola in which Austrian Roland Ratzenberger and Ayrton Senna both died in crashes on successive days. During the Monaco event, Austrian Karl Wendlinger had an accident in his Sauber in the tunnel; he went into a coma and was to miss the rest of the season. The German Michael Schumacher won the 1994 Monaco event. The 1996 race saw Michael Schumacher take pole position before crashing out on the first lap after being overtaken by Damon Hill. Hill led the first 40 laps before his engine expired in the tunnel. Jean Alesi took the lead but suffered suspension failure 20 laps later. Olivier Panis, who started in 14th place, moved into the lead and stayed there until the end of the race, being pushed all the way by David Coulthard. It was Panis's only win, and the last for his Ligier team. Only three cars crossed the finish line, but seven were classified.

Seven-time world champion Schumacher would eventually win the race five times, matching Graham Hill's record. In his appearance at the 2006 event, he attracted criticism when, while provisionally holding pole position and with the qualifying session drawing to a close, he stopped his car at the Rascasse hairpin, blocking the track and obliging competitors to slow down. Although Schumacher claimed it was the unintentional result of a genuine car failure, the FIA disagreed and he was sent to the back of the grid.

In July 2010, Bernie Ecclestone announced that a 10-year deal had been reached with the race organisers, keeping the race on the calendar until at least 2020.

Due to the COVID-19 pandemic, the FIA announced the 2020 Monaco Grand Prix's postponement, along with the two other races scheduled for May 2020, to help prevent the spread of the virus.
However, later the same day the Automobile Club de Monaco confirmed that the Grand Prix was instead cancelled, making 2020 the first time the Grand Prix was not run since 1954. It returned in 2021, on 23 May, where Max Verstappen won his first Monaco Grand Prix.

In September 2022 the Grand Prix signed a new race contract to remain on the F1 calendar until the 2025 season.

Circuit

The Circuit de Monaco consists of the city streets of Monte Carlo and La Condamine, which includes the famous harbour. It is unique in having been held on the same circuit every time it has been run over such a long period – only the Italian Grand Prix, which has been held at Autodromo Nazionale Monza during every Formula One regulated year except 1980, has a similarly lengthy and close relationship with a single circuit.

The race circuit has many elevation changes, tight corners, and a narrow course that makes it one of the most demanding tracks in Formula One racing. , two drivers have crashed and ended up in the harbour, the most famous being Alberto Ascari in 1955. Despite the fact that the course has had minor changes several times during its history, it is still considered the ultimate test of driving skills in Formula One, and if it were not already an existing Grand Prix, it would not be permitted to be added to the schedule for safety reasons. Even in 1929, La Vie Automobile magazine offered the opinion that "Any respectable traffic system would have covered the track with <<Danger>> sign posts left, right and centre".

Triple Formula One champion Nelson Piquet was fond of saying that racing at Monaco was "like trying to cycle round your living room", but added that "a win here was worth two anywhere else".

Notably, the course includes a tunnel. The contrast of daylight and gloom when entering/exiting the tunnel presents "challenges not faced elsewhere", as the drivers have to "adjust their vision as they emerge from the tunnel at the fastest point of the track and brake for the chicane in the daylight.".

The fastest-ever qualifying lap was set by Lewis Hamilton in qualifying (Q3) for the 2019 Monaco Grand Prix, at a time of 1:10.166.

Viewing areas
During the Grand Prix weekend, spectators crowd around the Monaco Circuit. There are a number of temporary grandstands built around the circuit, mostly around the harbour area. The rich and famous spectators often arrive on their boats and the yachts through the harbour. Balconies around Monaco become viewing areas for the race as well. Many hotels and residents cash in on the bird's eye views of the race.

Organization

The Monaco Grand Prix is organised each year by the Automobile Club de Monaco which also runs the Monte Carlo Rally and the Junior Monaco Kart Cup.

The Monaco Grand Prix differs in several ways from other Grands Prix. The practice session for the race was traditionally held on the Thursday preceding the race instead of Friday. This allows the streets to be opened to the public again on Friday. From the 2022 event onwards the first two Formula One practice sessions will now be held on Friday, bringing the running schedule for Formula One in line with other Grands Prix. Support races will still be run on Thursday. Until the late 1990s the race started at 3:30 p.m. local time – an hour and a half later than other European Formula One races. In recent years the race has fallen in line with the other Formula One races for the convenience of television viewers. Also, earlier the event was traditionally held on the week of Ascension Day. For many years, the numbers of cars admitted to Grands Prix was at the discretion of the race organisers – Monaco had the smallest grids, ostensibly because of its narrow and twisting track. Only 18 cars were permitted to start the 1975 Monaco Grand Prix, compared to 23 to 26 cars at all other rounds that year.

The erecting of the circuit takes six weeks, and the removal after the race takes three weeks. Until 2017, there was no proper podium at the race. Instead, a section of the track was closed after the race to act as parc fermé, a place where the cars are held for official inspection. The first three drivers in the race left their cars there and walked directly to the royal box where the 'podium' ceremony was held, which was considered a custom for the race. The trophies were handed out before the national anthems for the winning driver and team are played, as opposed to other Grands Prix where the anthems are played first.

Fame
The Monaco Grand Prix is widely considered to be one of the most important and prestigious automobile races in the world alongside the Indianapolis 500 and the 24 Hours of Le Mans. These three races are considered to form a Triple Crown of the three most famous motor races in the world. As of 2022, Graham Hill is the only driver to have won the Triple Crown, by winning all three races. The practice session for Monaco overlaps with that for the Indianapolis 500, and the races themselves sometimes clash. As the two races take place on opposite sides of the Atlantic Ocean and form part of different championships, it is difficult for one driver to compete effectively in both during his career. Juan Pablo Montoya and Fernando Alonso are the only active drivers to have won two of the three events.

In awarding its first gold medal for motorsport to Prince Rainier III, the Fédération Internationale de l'Automobile (FIA) characterised the Monaco Grand Prix as contributing "an exceptional location of glamour and prestige" to motorsport. The Grand Prix has been run under the patronage of three generations of Monaco's royal family: Louis II, Rainier III and Albert II, all of whom have taken a close interest in the race. A large part of the principality's income comes from tourists attracted by the warm climate and the famous casino, but it is also a tax haven and is home to many millionaires, including several Formula One drivers.

Monaco has produced four native Formula One drivers - Louis Chiron, André Testut, Olivier Beretta, and Charles Leclerc - but its tax status has made it home to many drivers over the years, including Gilles Villeneuve and Ayrton Senna. Of the  Formula One contenders, several have property in the principality, including Jenson Button and David Coulthard, who was part owner of a hotel there. Because of the small size of the town and the location of the circuit, drivers whose races end early can usually get back to their apartments in minutes. Ayrton Senna famously retired to his apartment after crashing out of the lead of the 1988 race.

The Grand Prix attracts big-name celebrities each year who come to experience the glamour and prestige of the event. Big parties are held in the nightclubs on the Grand Prix weekend, and the Port Hercule fills up with party-goers joining in the celebrations.

Criticism

In the 21st century, several commentators and F1 drivers have called the Grand Prix the most boring race of all circuits, both to drive and to watch as a spectator. Criticism has been directed towards how few overtake attempts are performed, as well as how frequently the driver who sets the pole position wins. Fernando Alonso has said that the race is “the most boring race ever,” and Lewis Hamilton  stated that the 2022 Grand Prix “wasn’t really racing.”

Winners

Repeat winners (drivers)
Drivers in bold are competing in the Formula One championship in the current season.

Repeat winners (constructors)
Teams in bold are competing in the Formula One championship in the current season.
A pink background indicates an event which was not part of the Formula One World Championship.
A yellow background indicates an event which was part of the pre-war European Championship.

Repeat winners (engine manufacturers)
Manufacturers in bold are competing in the Formula One championship in the current season.
A pink background indicates an event which was not part of the Formula One World Championship.
A yellow background indicates an event which was part of the pre-war European Championship.

* Between 1998 and 2005 built by Ilmor, funded by Mercedes

** Built by Cosworth, funded by Ford

*** Built by Porsche

By year
A pink background indicates an event which was not part of the Formula One World Championship.
A yellow background indicates an event which was part of the pre-war European Championship.

Previous circuit configurations

See also
 Triple Crown of Motorsport

References

Bibliography

Kettlewell, Mike. "Monaco: Road Racing on the Riviera", in Northey, Tom, editor. World of Automobiles, Volume 12, pp. 1381–4. London: Orbis, 1974.

External links

 Automobile Club de Monaco
 Grand Prix de Monaco
 Satellite Map of Monaco Grand Prix track
 Monte Carlo Formula 1 statistics

 
Formula One Grands Prix
Sports competitions in Monaco
Pre-World Championship Grands Prix
National Grands Prix
Recurring sporting events established in 1929
1929 establishments in Monaco
Spring (season) events in Monaco